Vanadium(V) oxide  (vanadia) is the inorganic compound with the formula  V2O5.  Commonly known as vanadium pentoxide, it is a brown/yellow solid, although when freshly precipitated from aqueous solution, its colour is deep orange.  Because of its high oxidation state, it is both an amphoteric oxide and an oxidizing agent. From the industrial perspective, it is the most important compound of vanadium, being the principal precursor to alloys of vanadium and is a widely used industrial catalyst.

The mineral form of this compound, shcherbinaite, is extremely rare, almost always found among fumaroles. A mineral trihydrate, V2O5·3H2O, is also known under the name of navajoite.

Chemical properties

Reduction to lower oxides
Upon heating a mixture of vanadium(V) oxide and vanadium(III) oxide, comproportionation occurs to give vanadium(IV) oxide, as a deep-blue solid:
V2O5  +  V2O3  →   4 VO2
The reduction can also be effected by oxalic acid, carbon monoxide, and sulfur dioxide. Further reduction using hydrogen or excess CO can lead to complex mixtures of oxides such as V4O7 and V5O9 before black V2O3 is reached.

Acid-base reactions
V2O5 is an amphoteric oxide. Unlike most metal oxides, it dissolves slightly in water to give a pale yellow, acidic solution. Thus V2O5 reacts with strong non-reducing acids to form solutions containing the pale yellow salts containing dioxovanadium(V) centers:
V2O5 + 2 HNO3  →  2 VO2(NO3) + H2O 

It also reacts with strong alkali to form polyoxovanadates, which have a complex structure that depends on pH. If excess aqueous sodium hydroxide is used, the product is a colourless salt, sodium orthovanadate, Na3VO4. If acid is slowly added to a solution of Na3VO4, the colour gradually deepens through orange to red before brown hydrated V2O5 precipitates around pH 2. These solutions contain mainly the ions HVO42− and V2O74− between pH 9 and pH 13, but below pH 9 more exotic species such as V4O124− and HV10O285− (decavanadate) predominate.

Upon treatment with thionyl chloride, it converts to the volatile liquid vanadium oxychloride, VOCl3:
V2O5 +  3 SOCl2 → 2 VOCl3 + 3 SO2

Other redox reactions
Hydrochloric acid and hydrobromic acid are oxidised to the corresponding halogen, e.g.,
V2O5 +  6HCl + 7H2O → 2[VO(H2O)5]2+  +  4Cl− + Cl2

Vanadates or vanadyl compounds in acid solution are reduced by zinc amalgam through the colourful pathway:

The ions are all hydrated to varying degrees.

Preparation

Technical grade V2O5 is produced as a black powder used for the production of vanadium metal and ferrovanadium. A vanadium ore or vanadium-rich residue is treated with sodium carbonate and an ammonium salt to produce sodium metavanadate, NaVO3. This material is then acidified to pH 2–3 using H2SO4 to yield a precipitate of "red cake" (see above). The red cake is then melted at 690 °C to produce the crude V2O5.

Vanadium(V) oxide is produced when vanadium metal is heated with excess oxygen, but this product is contaminated with other, lower oxides. A more satisfactory laboratory preparation involves the decomposition of ammonium metavanadate at 500–550 °C:
2 NH4VO3  →  V2O5 +  2 NH3 + H2O

Uses

Ferrovanadium production
In terms of quantity, the dominant use for vanadium(V) oxide is in the production of ferrovanadium (see above). The oxide is heated with scrap iron and ferrosilicon, with lime added to form a calcium silicate slag. Aluminium may also be used, producing the iron-vanadium alloy along with alumina as a

Sulfuric acid production
Another important use of vanadium(V) oxide is in the manufacture of sulfuric acid, an important industrial chemical with an annual worldwide production of 165 million tonnes in 2001, with an approximate value of US$8 billion. Vanadium(V) oxide serves the crucial purpose of catalysing the mildly exothermic oxidation of sulfur dioxide to sulfur trioxide by air in the contact process:
2 SO2  +  O2    2 SO3

The discovery of this simple reaction, for which V2O5 is the most effective catalyst, allowed sulfuric acid to become the cheap commodity chemical it is today.  The reaction is performed between 400 and 620 °C; below 400 °C the V2O5 is inactive as a catalyst, and above 620 °C it begins to break down. Since it is known that V2O5 can be reduced to VO2 by SO2, one likely catalytic cycle is as follows:
SO2  +  V2O5  →  SO3  +  2VO2
followed by
2VO2 +½O2  →  V2O5

It is also used as catalyst in the selective catalytic reduction (SCR) of NOx emissions in some power plants and diesel engines.  Due to its effectiveness in converting sulfur dioxide into sulfur trioxide, and thereby sulfuric acid, special care must be taken with the operating temperatures and placement of a power plant's SCR unit when firing sulfur-containing fuels.

Other oxidations

Maleic anhydride is produced by the V2O5-catalysed oxidation of butane with air:
C4H10  +  4 O2   →   C2H2(CO)2O  +  8 H2O
Maleic anhydride is used for the production of polyester resins and alkyd resins.

Phthalic anhydride is produced similarly by V2O5-catalysed oxidation of ortho-xylene or naphthalene at 350–400 °C.  The equation for the vanadium oxide-catalysed oxidation of o-xylene to phthalic anhydride:
C6H4(CH3)2  +  3 O2   →   C6H4(CO)2O +  3 H2O
The equation for the vanadium oxide-catalysed oxidation of naphthalene to phthalic anhydride:
C10H8 + 4½ O2   →   C6H4(CO)2O + 2CO2 + 2H2O
Phthalic anhydride is a precursor to plasticisers, used for conferring pliability to polymers.

A variety of other industrial compounds are produced similarly, including adipic acid, acrylic acid,  oxalic acid, and anthraquinone.

Other applications
Due to its high coefficient of thermal resistance, vanadium(V) oxide finds use as a detector material in bolometers and microbolometer arrays for thermal imaging. It also finds application as an ethanol sensor in ppm levels (up to 0.1 ppm).

Vanadium redox batteries are a type of flow battery used for energy storage, including large power facilities such as wind farms. Vanadium oxide is also used as a cathode in lithium ion batteries.

Biological activity

Vanadium(V) oxide exhibits very modest acute toxicity to humans, with an LD50 of about 470 mg/kg. The greater hazard is with inhalation of the dust, where the LD50 ranges from 4–11 mg/kg for a 14-day exposure. Vanadate, formed by hydrolysis of V2O5 at high pH, appears to inhibit enzymes that process phosphate (PO43−). However the mode of action remains elusive.

References

Cited sources

Further reading
.
.

External links

How Vanadium Oxide Is Used In Energy Storage

Vanadium Pentoxide and other Inorganic Vanadium Compounds (Concise International Chemical Assessment Document 29)

Vanadium(V) compounds
Catalysts
Infrared sensor materials
IARC Group 2B carcinogens
Oxidizing agents
Transition metal oxides